Golf competitions at the 2023 Pan American Games in Santiago, Chile will be held between November 2 and 5, 2023 at the Prince of Wales Country Club, located in La Reina.

A total of two events will be contested: an individual competition for men and women.

Qualification

A total of 64 golfers (32 per gender) will qualify to compete. Each nation is able to enter a maximum of 4 athletes (two per gender). The host nation, Chile, automatically qualified the maximum number of athletes (4). The rest of the spots will be awarded across the Official World Golf Ranking and Women's World Golf Rankings as of July 3, 2023. Any remaining spots will be allocated using the World Amateur Golf Ranking as of July 3, 2023.

Competition schedule
The following was the competition schedule for the golf competitions:

Medal summary

Medalists

References

 
2023
Events at the 2023 Pan American Games
Pan American Games